The Stone of Scone—also known as the Stone of Destiny, and often referred to in England as The Coronation Stone—is an oblong block of red sandstone that has been used for centuries in the coronation of the monarchs of Scotland.

Historically, the artefact was kept at the now-ruined Scone Abbey in Scone, near Perth, Scotland. It was seized by Edward I's forces from Scone during the English invasion of Scotland in 1296, and was used in the coronation of the monarchs of England as well as the monarchs of Great Britain and the United Kingdom, following the Treaty of Union of 1707. A roughly incised cross is on one surface, and an iron ring at each end aids with transport. Monarchs used to sit on the Stone of Scone itself until a wooden platform was added to the Coronation Chair in the 17th century.

In 1996, the British Government decided to return the stone to Scotland, when not in use at coronations, and it was transported to Edinburgh Castle, where it is now kept with the Scottish Crown Jewels.

Origin and legends

Various theories and legends exist about the stone's history prior to its placement in Scone. One story concerns  Fergus, son of Erc, the first King of the Scots in Scotland, whose transport of the Stone from Ireland to Argyll, where he was crowned on it, was recorded in a 15th-century chronicle. Some versions identify the stone brought by Fergus with the Lia Fáil (Irish for "stone of destiny") used at Tara for inaugurating the  High Kings of Ireland. Other traditions contend that the Lia Fáil remains at Tara. (Inis Fáil, "The Island of Destiny", is one of the traditional names of Ireland.) Other legends place the origins of the Stone in  Biblical times and identify it as the Stone of Jacob, taken by Jacob from  Bethel while on the way to Haran (Genesis 28:10–22). This very same Stone of Jacob was then supposedly taken to ancient Ireland by the prophet Jeremiah.

Contradicting these legends, geologists have proven that the stone taken by Edward I of England to Westminster is a "lower Old Red Sandstone", which was quarried in the vicinity of Scone. Doubts over the authenticity of the stone at Westminster have existed for a long time: a blog post by retired Scottish academic and writer of historical fiction, Marie MacPherson, shows that they date back at least two hundred years.

A letter to the editor of the Morning Chronicle, dated 2 January 1819, states:

Dunsinane Hill has the remains of a late prehistoric hill fort, and this has historical associations with Macbeth, but no remains dating to the 11th century have been identified on the hill.

Westminster Abbey

In 1296, during the First Scottish War of Independence, King Edward I of England took the stone as spoils of war and removed it to Westminster Abbey, where it was fitted into a wooden chair – known as the Coronation Chair or King Edward's Chair – on which most subsequent English and then British sovereigns have been crowned. Edward I sought to claim the status of the "Lord Paramount" of Scotland, with the right to oversee its King.

Some doubt exists over the stone captured by Edward I. The Westminster Stone theory posits that the monks at Scone Palace hid the real stone in the River Tay, or buried it on Dunsinane Hill, and that the English troops were tricked into taking a substitute. Some proponents of this theory claim that historic descriptions of the stone do not match the present stone.

In the 1328 Treaty of Northampton between the Kingdom of Scotland and the Kingdom of England, England agreed to return the captured stone to Scotland; rioting crowds prevented it from being removed from Westminster Abbey. The stone remained in England for another six centuries. When King James VI of Scotland assumed the English throne as James I of England, he was crowned at Westminster Abbey on the stone. For the next century, the  Stuart kings and queens of Scotland once again sat on the stone – but at their coronation as kings and queens of, and in, England.

1914 suffragette bombing
On 11 June 1914, as part of the suffragette bombing and arson campaign of 1912-1914, suffragettes of the Women's Social and Political Union planted a bomb loaded with nuts and bolts to act as shrapnel next to the Coronation Chair and Stone; no serious injuries were reported in the aftermath of the subsequent explosion despite the building having been busy with 80-100 visitors, but the deflagration blew off a corner of the Coronation Chair and caused the Stone to break in half – although this was not discovered until 1950, when four Scottish nationalists broke into the church to steal the stone and return it to Scotland. Two days after the Westminster Abbey bombing, a second suffragette bomb was discovered before it could explode in St Paul's Cathedral.

Early 20th century
Concerns about it being damaged or destroyed by German air raids during the Second World War resulted in the Coronation Chair being moved to Gloucester Cathedral for the duration of the war. Meanwhile, concerns about the propaganda implications of the stone falling into German hands led to it being hidden behind ancient lead coffins in a burial vault under Abbot Islip’s Chapel, situated off the north ambulatory of the abbey. Other than the Dean, Paul de Labilliere and the Surveyor of the Fabric of Westminster Abbey, Charles Peers, only a few other people knew of its hiding place. Worried that the secret could be lost if all of them were killed during the war, Peers drew up three maps showing its location. Two were sent in sealed envelopes to Canada, one to the Canadian Prime Minister  William King, who deposited it in the Bank of Canada’s vault in Ottawa. The other went to the Lieutenant Governor of Ontario, who stored his envelope in the Bank of Montreal in Toronto. Once he had received word that the envelopes had been received, Peers destroyed the third map, which he had been keeping at his bank.  
Peers later received a suggestion via the Office of Works that the Stone should be sent to Scotland for safekeeping:
 “I trust the Office of Works will not lend itself to this attempt by the Scotch to get hold of the Stone by a side wind. You cannot be so simple as not to know that this acquisitive nation have ever since the time of Edward I been attempting by fair means or foul, to get possession of the Stone, and during my time at Westminster we have received warnings from the Police that Scottish emissaries were loose in London, intending to steal the Stone and we had better lock up the Confessor’s Chapel, where it is normally kept.”

Removal

On Christmas Day 1950, a group of four Scottish students (Ian Hamilton, Gavin Vernon, Kay Matheson, and Alan Stuart) removed the stone from Westminster Abbey, intending to return it to Scotland. During the removal process, the stone broke into two pieces. After burying the greater part of the Stone in a Kent field, where they camped for a few days, they uncovered the buried stone and returned to Scotland, along with a new accomplice, John Josselyn.

According to one American diplomat who was posted in Edinburgh at the time, the stone was briefly hidden in a trunk in the basement of the consulate's Public Affairs Officer, unbeknownst to him, then brought up further north. The smaller piece was similarly brought north at a later time. The entire stone was passed to a senior Glasgow politician, who arranged for the Glasgow stonemason Robert Gray to repair it professionally.

The British Government ordered a major search for the stone, but was unsuccessful. The stone was left by those that had been hiding it on the altar of Arbroath Abbey on 11 April 1951, a property owned by the Church of Scotland. Once the London police were informed of its whereabouts, the stone was returned to Westminster four months after its removal. Afterward, rumours circulated that copies of the stone had been made, and that the returned stone was not the original.

Return to Scotland
On 3 July 1996, in response to a growing discussion around Scottish cultural history, the British Government announced that the stone would return to Scotland, 700 years after it had been taken. On 15 November 1996, after a handover ceremony at the border between representatives of the Home Office and of the Scottish Office, the stone was transported to Edinburgh Castle. An official handover ceremony occurred in the Castle on 30 November 1996, St Andrew's Day, to mark the arrival of the stone. Prince Andrew, Duke of York, representing Queen Elizabeth II, formally handed over the Royal Warrant transferring the stone into the safekeeping of the  Commissioners for the Regalia. It currently remains alongside the crown jewels of Scotland, the Honours of Scotland, in the Crown Room of Edinburgh Castle.

Future public display
As part of a consultation in 2019, the Scottish Government asked the public for their views on the preferred future location for public display of the Stone of Scone. Two options were proposed: featuring as the centrepiece of a proposed new museum in Perth (a £23 million redevelopment of the former Perth City Hall) or remaining at the present location at Edinburgh Castle in a major redevelopment of the existing display.

In December 2020, the Scottish Government announced the stone would be relocated to Perth City Hall.

In September 2022, Historic Environment Scotland announced that the stone would temporarily return to Westminster Abbey for the coronation of Charles III.

Film and television 
 In December 1980 the film The Pinch aired on BBC 2.
 In the episode "Pendragon" of the animated series Gargoyles, King Arthur returns to Britain in the 20th century and receives instructions from the Stone on how to locate Excalibur.
 The season 5, episode 15 story arc of  Highlander: The Series retells how Duncan MacLeod was involved in the theft and return of the stone.
 The Stone of Scone's removal from Westminster Abbey and return to Scotland is the subject of the 2008 film Stone of Destiny.
 In the 2010 film The King's Speech, Lionel Logue (Geoffrey Rush) intentionally provokes George VI (Colin Firth) by sitting in the Coronation Chair and propping his feet on the Stone.
 It also appears in the final two episodes of Hamish Macbeth, "Destiny" parts 1 and 2.
 Episode 2 "Stoned" of the Stuff the British Stole series hosted by Marc Fennell aired in November 2022 on ABC TV.

Literature
 In his 1944 novel The North Wind of Love (Bk.1), Compton Mackenzie adumbrates the liberation of the Stone of Destiny from Westminster Cathedral and its return to Scotland by a group of Scottish Nationalists. However, the plan was aborted after one of the protagonists in his cups told a journalist about it, the journalist promptly arranging for the plot to be published in the daily press. It seems likely that this fictional plot to remove the Stone was the inspiration for its actual removal in 1950.
 Andrew Greig's 2008 novel Romanno Bridge is about a quest for the real Stone of Scone.
 August Derleth featured the removal and return of the stone in his short story "The Adventure of the Stone of Scone".
 In the alternate history novel Dominion by C. J. Sansom, the Stone of Scone is returned to Scotland by the fictional Nazi puppet government in control of the United Kingdom during World War II.
 In The Fifth Elephant, by Terry Pratchett, the Scone of Stone [used for the coronation of Dwarven kings] is destroyed and duplicated.
 In the 1936 novel, Nightwood, by Djuna Barnes, Dr. Matthew O'Connor mentions the "Holy Stone" and its connection to Westminster Abbey and Simon Brec, during an argument with Nora Flood.

See also
 Blarney Stone (Ireland)
 Coronation Stone, Kingston upon Thames (England)
 Duke's Chair (Austria)
 Edward Faraday Odlum
 History of Scotland
 Lia Fáil (Ireland)
 Omphalos
 Prince's Stone (Slovenia)
 Stone of Jacob
 Stones of Mora (Sweden)

References

Further reading

 No Stone Unturned: The Story of the Stone of Destiny, Ian R. Hamilton, Victor Gollancz and also Funk and Wagnalls, 1952, 1953, hardcover, 191 pages, An account of the return of the stone to Scotland in 1950 (older, but more available)
 Taking of the Stone of Destiny, Ian R. Hamilton, Seven Hills Book Distributors, 1992, hardcover,  (modern reprint, but expensive)
 Martin-Gil F.J., Martin-Ramos P. and Martin-Gil J. "Is Scotland's Coronation Stone a Measurement Standard from the Middle Bronze Age?". Anistoriton, issue P024 of 14 December 2002.
 The Stone of Destiny: Symbol of Nationhood by David Breeze, Chief Inspector of Ancient Monuments, and Graeme Munro, Chief Executive, Historic Scotland; Published by Historic Scotland 1997:

External links

 
 Highlights: The Stone of Destiny Edinburgh Castle website
 The Stone of Destiny, sacred kingship in the 21st century

Individual thrones
Scone
Scottish royalty
British monarchy
Art and cultural repatriation
Sacred rocks